Herbert Gadsden (12 September 1893 – 1973) was an English footballer who played for Stoke.

Career
Gadsden was born in Nottingham and played amateur football with Standen Hill Victoria before joining Stoke in 1912. He became Stoke's first choice goalkeeper in 1912–13 and 1913–14 before losing his place to Richard Herron in 1914–15. After World War I Gadsden returned to amateur football with Mansfield Invicta and Notts Rangers.

Career statistics

References

English footballers
Stoke City F.C. players
1893 births
1973 deaths
Notts Rangers F.C. players
Association football goalkeepers